The Grand Central station was the terminal for some trains of the IRT Third Avenue Line, also known as the Third Avenue El, in Manhattan, New York City. This station originally had one island platform and two side platforms, all connected at the west end (later converted to three tracks and two island platforms). The tracks ended just east of the Park Avenue Viaduct ramp over Pershing Square.

It opened August 26, 1878, and served not only Grand Central Terminal but also its two predecessors, Grand Central Station (1899-1913) and Grand Central Depot (1871-1899). When the El opened north of 42nd Street in September 1878, this segment was reduced to a shuttle, which connected to the mainline at the 42nd Street station, at Third Avenue.

In 1904, the Interborough Rapid Transit Company opened the Grand Central station as part of its first subway line. Platforms for the IRT Flushing Line opened in 1915, followed by those for the IRT Lexington Avenue Line in 1918; after the Lexington Avenue Line platforms opened, the original platforms at the station were converted for use by the 42nd Street Shuttle. By this time, the El station had become obsolete and it was closed on December 6, 1923.

References

External links
Grand Central Branch of the Third Avenue El (NYCSubway.org)

IRT Third Avenue Line stations
Railway stations in the United States opened in 1878
Railway stations closed in 1923
1878 establishments in New York (state)
1923 disestablishments in New York (state)
Former elevated and subway stations in Manhattan
Grand Central Terminal